Glee: The Music, Volume 6 is the eighth soundtrack album by the cast of the American musical television series Glee, released on May 23, 2011 through the Twentieth Century Fox Film Corporation and Columbia Records. The album serves as the sixth and final release for the series' second season, and contains three original tracks including "Light Up the World", which was co-written by Swedish songwriter Max Martin. All of its eighteen tracks have been released as singles, available for digital download.

Background
Announced on May 3, 2011, Glee: The Music, Volume 6 is the final release from the second season of Glee, featuring music from the episode "A Night of Neglect" through the end of the season. The album's final three tracks—"As Long As You're There", "Pretending", and "Light Up the World"—are original songs. "As Long As You're There" is performed by guest star Charice and "Light Up the World" was co-written with Swedish songwriter Max Martin, who had previously helped to write "Loser like Me", another song for the series. Recurring guest stars Gwyneth Paltrow, Kristin Chenoweth, and Jonathan Groff appear as featured artists on the album. Glee: The Music, Volume 6 was released on May 23, 2011. "Light Up the World" premiered through Ryan Seacrest's website on May 10, 2011.

Reception

Andrew Leahey of AllMusic gave the album a rating of three-and-a-half stars out of a possible five, and wrote that it "plays up the show's creative side". He cited "I Feel Pretty / Unpretty" as being "one of the show's prettiest tributes to self-acceptance", and also commends the Chenoweth and Matthew Morrison cover of Fleetwood Mac's "Dreams". Leahey noted that "the second half of the album doesn't fare as well as the first", but added that the album was better "than some of its predecessors". He criticized the inclusion of a "lackluster version of 'Dancing Queen when there were "better songs that didn't make the cut".

Many of the songs on the album were reviewed positively when they appeared on the show. Meghan Brown of The Atlantic wrote that "As If We Never Said Goodbye" sung by Chris Colfer was "absolutely stunning in every conceivable way". John Kubicek of BuddyTV called "Rolling in the Deep" as sung by Groff and Lea Michele "one of the best vocal performances this show has ever seen". Erica Futterman of Rolling Stone called the performance a "passion-filled winner", though she detected "some oversinging". Other songs were not as well received, including Paltrow's rendition of Adele's "Turning Tables". Futterman said the vocals "lacked the texture that made Adele's version so heartbreaking", and MTV's Aly Semigran wrote that while Paltrow is "a nice enough singer," she "in no way has the chops" the song requires.

Glee: The Music, Volume 6 debuted at number four on the US Billboard 200 and number one on Billboard Soundtracks chart, selling 80,000 copies in its first week, giving it the second-lowest opening sales figure for a Glee release after the 48,000 copies sold by extended play Glee: The Music, The Rocky Horror Glee Show. It sold 25,000 copies in its second week, and stayed at the top of the soundtracks chart for three consecutive weeks.

Singles
All tracks on the album have been released as singles, available for digital download. Glee cover of Adele's "Turning Tables", performed by Paltrow, has charted at number sixty-six on both the Canadian Hot 100 and the US Billboard Hot 100. The single sold 47,000 copies in its first week in the US. A mash-up of "I Feel Pretty" from the musical West Side Story and "Unpretty" by TLC reached number twenty-two on the Billboard Hot 100 and also became a top forty hit in Canada, Ireland, and the UK. Selling 112,000 copies in the US, its appearance marked the first time "I Feel Pretty" charted on the Hot 100.

Track listing
Unless otherwise indicated, Information is taken from Liner Notes

Notes
Even though Darren Criss, Jane Lynch & Jayma Mays are credited in the “Glee Cast Vocals” section of the Liner Notes, their vocals do not appear on this album. 
”Unpretty” is allegedly based on the song “Make Up Your Mind”, written by Corey Glover and Michael Cirincione.

Personnel

Dianna Agron – cast, lead vocals
Adam Anders – arranger, digital editing, producer, soundtrack producer, vocal arrangement, additional vocals, composer
Alex Anders – digital editing, engineer, vocal producer, additional vocals
Nikki Anders – additional vocals
Benny Andersson – composer
Peer Åström – arranger, engineer, mixing, producer, composer
Kala Balch – additional vocals
Shoshana Bean – additional vocals
Leonard Bernstein – composer
Dave Bett – art direction
Don Black – composer
PJ Bloom – music supervisor
Ravaughn Brown – additional vocals
Lindsey Buckingham – composer
Geoff Bywater – executive in charge of music
Charice – cast, lead vocals
Kristin Chenoweth – cast, lead vocals
Deyder Cintron – assistant engineer, digital editing
Chris Colfer – cast, lead vocals
Kamari Copeland – additional vocals
Darren Criss – cast, vocals
Tim Davis – vocal contractor, additional vocals
Dante Di Loreto – soundtrack executive producer
Brad Falchuk – soundtrack executive producer
Chris Feldmann – art direction
Serban Ghenea – mixing
Ryan Gilmor – digital editing
Jonathan Groff – cast, lead vocals
Heather Guibert – coordination
Christopher Hampton – composer
Fredrik Jansson – assistant engineer
Claude Kelly – composer
Savan Kotecha – composer
Storm Lee – additional vocals
Andrew Lloyd Webber – composer

David Loucks – additional vocals
Jane Lynch – cast, vocals
Meaghan Lyons – coordination
Dominick Maita – mastering
Max Martin – composer, producer
Jayma Mays – cast, vocals
Kevin McHale – cast, lead vocals
Christine McVie – composer
Lea Michele – cast, lead vocals
Cory Monteith – cast, lead vocals
Heather Morris – cast, lead vocals
Matthew Morrison – cast, lead vocals
Ryan Murphy – producer, soundtrack producer
Stevie Nicks – composer
Christian Nilsson – digital editing
Jeanette Olsson – additional vocals
Chord Overstreet – cast, lead vocals
Gwyneth Paltrow – cast, lead vocals
Shelly Peiken – composer
Martin Persson – programming
Nicole Ray – production coordination
Amber Riley – cast, lead vocals
Naya Rivera – cast, lead vocals
Mark Salling – cast, lead vocals
Drew Ryan Scott – additional vocals
Onitsha Shaw – additional vocals
Shellback – composer, producer
Jenny Sinclair – coordination
Stephen Sondheim – composer
Björn Ulvaeus – composer
Jenna Ushkowitz – cast, lead vocals
Windy Wagner – additional vocals
Joe Wohlmuth – engineer
Stevie Wonder – composer

Source: Allmusic

Charts and certifications

Weekly charts

Year-end charts

Certifications

Release history

References

External links
Glee: The Music, Volume 6 at GleeTheMusic.com
Glee: The Music, Volume 6 at Allmusic

2011 soundtrack albums
Columbia Records soundtracks
Glee (TV series) albums